"Don't Close Your Eyes" is a song written by Bob McDill, and recorded by American country music artist Keith Whitley.  It was released in March 1988 as third single from his album of the same name.  In the United States, the single reached number-one for the week of August 13, while peaking at number 2 in Canada. Additionally, it was Billboard's number-one country single of the year 1988.

Content 
In the song, the narrator is in a relationship with a girl who is still stuck on a former boyfriend.  The narrator tells her, "don't close your eyes," because he believes she is fantasizing about the other guy.

Music video
The music video was directed by Michael McClary and premiered in mid-1988.

Covers 
The song was covered by Alan Jackson for Keith Whitley's 1995 tribute album, by Kellie Pickler for the deluxe edition of her 2008 self-titled second album, and by The Voice Season 6 contestant Jake Worthington for his audition song and fan-chosen final performance. Garth Brooks performed the song at the 50th CMA Awards whilst Whitley's widow Lorrie Morgan looked emotional in the audience. Garth Brooks also recorded this song for The Ultimate Collection box set only sold at Target stores in 2016.

Commercial performance
The song reached number one on Billboards Hot Country Songs on chart dated August 13, 1988. After it became available for digital download, the song has sold 475,000 digital copies in the United States as of March 2019.

Charts

Weekly chart

Year-end Chart

Don't Close Your Eyes (Ashamed Remix) 

On July 1, 2015, Billboard Magazine announced the release of "Don't Close Your Eyes (Ashamed)" a tribute to Keith Whitley on his 60th birthday. The song is performed by Shady Records recording artist Kxng Crooked fka Crooked I (from Slaughterhouse), Truth Ali, Jonathan Hay and Morgan McRae. "I feel the rap verses really capture the emotional torment of the original," producer Jonathan Hay tells Billboard. "As you may or may not know, Keith Whitley died from alcoholism -- Kxng Crooked talks about his own chilling battle with alcoholism in his verse," he adds of the evocative tribute. "One of the main reasons I wanted to do this tribute is because I was raised in Kentucky, just like Keith Whitley," Hay continues. "Being all over the United States, it seems Whitley is more iconic back home in the 'Bluegrass State' than he is everywhere else. We want to change that." "Don't Close Your Eyes (The Ashamed Remix)" is part of The Urban Hitchcock LP.

The music video premiered on MTV News on August 27.

References

1988 singles
1988 songs
Keith Whitley songs
Alan Jackson songs
Kellie Pickler songs
Billboard Hot Country Songs number-one singles of the year
Songs written by Bob McDill
Country ballads
Song recordings produced by Garth Fundis
RCA Records Nashville singles